Friedrich August Gottlob Schumann  (March 2, 1773 – August 10, 1826) was a German bookseller and publisher. His best-known work is the 18-volume Lexicon of Saxony, which was completed after his death by Albert Schiffner. He wrote Junker Kurt von Krötenstein's verliebte Heldenfahrt (Lord Kurt von Krötenstein's Hero's Journey of Love) under the pen name of Legaillard.

Schumann was born on 2 March 1773, as the oldest of 6 siblings to the couple Johann Friedrich Schumann and Christiane Magdalena Bohme. The family worked as a pastor in Endschutz, and had little money around, due to this August Schumann was unable to achieve higher education. 

He was the father of the composer Robert Schumann.

References

1773 births
1826 deaths
German lexicographers
German male non-fiction writers
Robert Schumann